Yuzhan (28 November 1923 – 8 July 2016), courtesy name Jungu, was a Chinese calligrapher of Manchu descent. He was a member of the Aisin Gioro clan, the imperial clan of the Manchu-led Qing dynasty. He was also the seventh son of Puwei and a great-grandson of Yixin (Prince Gong).

Yuzhan was born in Dalian, Liaoning on 28 November 1923. He developed a keen interest in calligraphy, and learned the style of the Qing imperial clan. During the Second Sino-Japanese War, Yuzhan and his father, Puwei, served in the puppet state of Manchukuo, where Puyi, the last emperor of the Qing dynasty, had been installed by the Japanese as Manchukuo's emperor. Puyi later referred to Yuzhan as "Xiaogu" in his autobiography. When Puwei died in 1936, Yuzhan inherited his father's princely title, "Prince Gong of the First Rank", and held this title until 1945. At the end of the war in 1945, Yuzhan was captured by Soviet forces and extradited to the War Criminals Management Centre in Fushun, Liaoning. He was released four years later in 1949.

Yuzhan was sent to perform forced labour during the Cultural Revolution (1966–1976) under the Communist regime. He was a member of many calligraphy societies in China and produced many works. He specialized in the semi-cursive and cursive scripts. Yuzhan died on 8 July 2016.

Ancestry

See also
 Royal and noble ranks of the Qing dynasty
 Ranks of imperial consorts in China#Qing

References

1923 births
2016 deaths
Aisin Gioro
Manchu people
Qing dynasty imperial princes
Artists from Dalian
Victims of the Cultural Revolution
People's Republic of China calligraphers
People of Manchukuo
People of the Republic of China